The 2015 Women's Super 3s was the inaugural Women's Super 3s competition that took place in Ireland. It ran from May to August, with 3 teams taking part made up of the best players in Ireland, with the aim of bridging the gap between club cricket and international cricket. The teams played 8 matches each, four 50 over matches and four Twenty20s. Scorchers were the inaugural winners of the competition, with five wins from their eight matches.

Competition format
The three teams played eight matches each in a league system. Each team played the other two sides twice in a 50 over match and twice in a Twenty20 match, with all matches contributing to 
a unified table.

The league worked on a points system with positions being based on the total points. Points were awarded as follows:

Win: 2 points. 
Tie: 1 point. 
Loss: 0 points.
Abandoned/No Result: 1 point.

Squads

Source: Cricket Ireland

Points table

Source: CricketArchive

References

Women's Super Series
2015 in Irish cricket